Peter Gilmore (1931–2013) was a British actor.

Peter Gilmore may also refer to:
Peter Gilmore (chef) (born 1968), Australian chef
Peter H. Gilmore (born 1956), American Satanist
Gus Gilmore (Peter Warwick Gilmore, born 1962), Australian general

See also
Peter Gilmour, Australian sailor